The New York Riptide are a professional box lacrosse franchise based in Uniondale, New York. They are members of the East Division of the National Lacrosse League (NLL). They play home games at Nassau Coliseum and began their first season in 2019.

History
On December 12, 2018, the NLL awarded an expansion franchise to Uniondale, New York and owner GF Sports. The team began play in December 2019 with its home arena being the Nassau Coliseum. The Riptide mark the return of the National Lacrosse League to the Long Island area after the departure of the New York Saints (1989–2003) and the New York Titans (2006–2009), both of whom also played at Nassau Coliseum.

The New York Riptide name and logo were announced on February 17, 2019, as chosen by fans.

On January 18, 2020, the Riptide got their first win in franchise history when they beat the Georgia Swarm by a score of 13–12 in overtime at Nassau Coliseum.

On June 3, 2020, the entire coaching staff and lacrosse operations team, including head coach and general manager Regy Thorpe, were fired.

On July 10, 2020, the Riptide announced the hiring of Jim Veltman as general manager and Dan Ladouceur as head coach.

Veltman was relieved of his duties on January 9, 2023 and replaced by executive vice president Rich Lisk.

All-time record

Award winners

Coaching history

Draft history

NLL Entry Draft 
First Round Selections

 2019: Tyson Gibson (1st overall), Tyson Bomberry (10th overall) 
 2020: Jeff Teat (1st overall)
 2021: None
 2022: Zack Deaken (8th overall)

References

External links
 Official Website

 
National Lacrosse League teams
2018 establishments in New York (state)
Lacrosse clubs established in 2018